Zerzevan Castle, also known as Samachi Castle, is a ruined Eastern Roman castle, a former important military base, in Diyarbakır Province, southeastern Turkey. Archaeological excavations at the site revealed the existence of underground structures, among them a temple of Mithraism, a mystery religion. The castle was used as a civilian settlement between the 1890s and the 1960s. The site is partly open to tourism.

Etymology
Some travellers mention the name of this place as "Kasr Zerzaua" in 18th century while Evliya Celebi, an Ottoman traveller who lived in 17th century mentions in his Seyahatname (volume IV) about this place as "Zerzivan Valley" while travelling from Diyarbakir to Mardin. The name of Zerzevan derives from Kurdish word of "zêr" (gold) and it "is the changed form of Zerzaua mentioned by the travellers and it is the name given to the settlement while the village" was located in the same place.

Location
Zerzevan Castle was built in the 4th century by the Eastern Roman Empire as a military base on the ancient trade route between Diyarbakır and Mardin. It was in use until the 7th century.

Archaeological works
The first archaeological excavations took place in the summer months of 2014. The works were initially carried out by a team of 35 led by an archaeologist from Dicle University, under the supervision of the Diyarbakır Archaeological Museum. In 2015, the size of the team working at the site increased to 60. It is expected that excavation works will continue for around 30 more years.

In 2020, archaeologists found the entrance of the castle.

In 2021, archaeologists discovered a flute with six holes and a bronze ring with a key which was used to open a chest. Both items dated back to the 4th and 5th centuries AD.

Castle

The castle contains structures both above and below ground. Inside the castle, there are ruins in a wide area and a rock-necropolis. In the north of the castle, which is at a lower elevation, residences and streets were erected while in the south public buildings were constructed on the higher terrain. A church building facing east-west remains one of the most well-conserved public buildings. Other public buildings include the palace, administrative building, baths, cereal storage, arsenal, and 54 cisterns. Military and medical material, jewelry, ornaments, and bronze coins were also found during the excavations. In 2016, a subterranean church and secret passageways were discovered. The discovered underground secret passageway was not in use for about 3,000 years and the subterranean church was closed around 1,500 years ago. A Mithraic underground temple and a subterranean sanctuary, able to hold 400 people, were also unearthed. The  underground temple remnants of the mystery religion attracted more than 20,000 tourists in just one week according to reports by officials. In 2017, four more underground locations were discovered, where further excavation works are necessary to unearth them.

The castle was an Eastern Roman military base and a strategic garrison settlement, dominating the entire valley and controlling the ancient road between Amida (now Diyarbakır) and Dara (now Mardin). The castle played a key role due to its location on the easternmost border protecting the Roman Empire. It marked the intersection and coalescence of the cultures in the west and the east.

The place was known as Samachi in classical antiquity. It was the site of heavy fighting between the Byzantine Empire and the Sasanian Empire. Jewelry found in the castle also indicates that the civilian population and military personnel resided together, with soldiers living alongside their family members. It was large enough to sustain a population of around one thousand.

Restoration and reconstruction works, which took place during the reigns of Eastern Roman emperors Anastasius I Dicorus (r. 491–518) and Justinian I (r. 527–565), saw the castle develop into its final state prior to its ruin. The castle was most likely in use until 639 with the arrival of Arab Muslims in the beginning of the Arab–Byzantine wars.

Use as civilian settlement
A new settlement was created within the castle once again in the 1890s, when a family moved into the castle. This village is called Demirölçek today.

References

External links

Gallery

Byzantine fortifications in Turkey
4th-century fortifications
Ruined castles in Turkey
Archaeological sites in Southeastern Anatolia
Buildings and structures in Diyarbakır Province
Çınar, Diyarbakır
Tourist attractions in Diyarbakır Province
World Heritage Tentative List for Turkey